Kaïlé Auvray (born 27 May 2004) is a professional footballer who plays as a winger for Sporting Kansas City II. Born in France, Auvray formerly played for the United States U17s and Saint Martin national team, before opting to play for the Trinidad and Tobago national team.

Early life
Auvray was born in Caen, France to the Guadeloupean father Stéphane Auvray and a Trinidadian mother. At the age of 5 he moved to Kansas City, Missouri when his father transferred to Sporting Kansas City, and shortly after joined their youth academy himself. He moved to Guadeloupe in 2017 to join the youth academy of Moulien for better opportunities to move to a European club. He was scouted by the youth academy of Lille in 2019, and he moved to mainland France to continue his development.

Career
Auvray worked his way up the youth sides at Lille, but had limited opportunity in the 2020–21 season due to the COVID-19 pandemic. He went on to make a couple of appearances for their reserves in the Championnat National 2 in 2022. Later in 2022, he moved to Minnesota United 2, but didn't make an appearance before being released. In February 2023, he returned to Kansas with Sporting Kansas City II.

International career
Auvray is eligible to play for Trinidad and Tobago, Guadeloupe and Saint Martin by descent, France by place of birth, and United States by residency. He was called up to the United States U17s for a friendly tournament in February 2020. In March 2021, he was called up to the France U17s for a set of friendlies.

Coached by his father, he debuted for the Saint Martin national team in a friendly 2–0 loss against his ancestral Trinidad and Tobago national team on 29 January 2023. The match exposed him to Trinidad and Tobago, who opted to pursue Auvray to join their national team. He debuted for the senior Trinidad and Tobago national team in a friendly 1–0 win over Jamaica on 11 March 2023.

References

External links
 
 
 FFF Profile

2004 births
Living people
Footballers from Caen
Trinidad and Tobago footballers
Trinidad and Tobago international footballers
Saint Martinois footballers
Saint Martin international footballers
American soccer players
French footballers
Association football wingers
Lille OSC players
Sporting Kansas City II players
Championnat National 3 players
Trinidad and Tobago people of Guadeloupean descent
Saint Martinois people of Trinidad and Tobago descent
Saint Martinois people of Guadeloupean descent
American people of Trinidad and Tobago descent
American people of Guadeloupean descent
French people of Trinidad and Tobago descent
French people of Guadeloupean descent
Dual internationalists (football)